Sodium decavanadate describes any member of the family of inorganic compounds with the formula Na6[V10O28](H2O)n. These are sodium salts of the orange-colored decavanadate anion [V10O28]6−. Numerous other decavanadate salts have been isolated and studied since 1956 when it was first characterized.

Preparation
The preparation of decavanadate is achieved by acidifying an aqueous solution of ortho-vanadate:

10 Na3[VO4]  +  24 HOAc   →   Na6[V10O28]  +  12 H2O  +  24 NaOAc

The formation of decavanadate is optimized by maintaining a pH range of 4–7.  Typical side products include metavanadate, [VO3]−, and hexavanadate, [V6O16]2−, ions.

Structure
The decavanadate ion consists of 10 fused VO6 octahedra and has D2h symmetry. The structure of Na6[V10O28]·18H2O has been confirmed with X-ray crystallography.

The decavanadate anions contains three sets of equivalent V atoms (see fig. 1). These include two central VO6 octahedra (Vc) and four each peripheral tetragonal-pyramidal VO5 groups (Va and Vb).  There are seven unique groups of oxygen atoms (labeled A through G).  Two of these (A) bridge to six V centers, four (B) bridge three V centers, fourteen of these (C, D and E) span edges between pairs of V centers, and eight (F and G) are peripheral.

The oxidation state of vanadium in decavanadate is +5.

Acid-base properties
Aqueous vanadate (V) compounds undergo various self-condensation reactions. Depending on pH, major vanadate anions in solution include VO2(H2O)42+, VO43−, V2O73−, V3O93−, V4O124−, and V10O286−. The anions often reversibly protonate. Decavanadate forms according to this equilibrium:

H3V10O283−   ⇌   H2V10O284−  +  H+
H2V10O284−  ⇌ HV10O285− + H+
HV10O285−(aq) ⇌ V10O286− +  H+

The structure of the various protonation states of the decavanadate ion has been examined by 51V NMR spectroscopy.  Each species gives three signals; with slightly varying chemical shifts around −425, −506, and −523 ppm relative to vanadium oxytrichloride; suggesting that rapid proton exchange occurs resulting in equally symmetric species.  The three protonations of decavanadate have been shown to occur at the bridging oxygen centers, indicated as B and C in figure 1.

Decavanadate is most stable in pH 4–7 region. Solutions of vanadate turn bright orange at pH 6.5, indicating the presence of decavanadate.  Other vanadates are colorless.  Below pH 2.0, brown V2O5 precipitates as the hydrate.

V10O286−  +  6H+  + 12H2   ⇌   5V2O5

Potential uses
Decavanadate has been found to inhibit phosphoglycerate mutase, an enzyme which catalyzes step 8 of glycolysis. In addition, decavandate was found to have modest inhibition of Leishmania tarentolae viability, suggesting that decavandate may have a potential use as a topical inhibitor of protozoan parasites.

Related decavanadates
Many decavanadate salts have been characterized.  NH4+, Ca2+, Ba2+, Sr2+, and group I decavanadate salts are prepared by the acid-base reaction between V2O5 and the oxide, hydroxide, carbonate, or hydrogen carbonate of the desired positive ion.

6 NH3  +  5 V2O5  +  3 H2O   ⇌   (NH4)6[V10O28]

Other decavanadates:

(NH4)6[V10O28]·6H2O
K6[V10O28]·9H2O
K6[V10O28]·10H2O
Ca3[V10O28]·16H2O
K2Mg2[V10O28]·16H2O
K2Zn2[V10O28]·16H2O
Cs2Mg2[V10O28]·16H2O
Cs4Na2[V10O28]·10H2O
K4Na2[V10O28]·16H2O
Sr3[V10O28]·22H2O
Ba3[V10O28]·19H2O
[(C6H5)4P]H3V10O28·4CH3CN
Ag6[V10O28]·4H2O
Naturally occurring decavanadates include:
Ca3V10O28·17 H2O (Pascoite)
Ca2Mg(V10O28)·16H2O (Magnesiopascoite)
Na4Mg(V10O28)·24H2O (Huemulite)

References

Vanadates
Sodium compounds